Henry Ellacombe may refer to:

Henry Thomas Ellacombe (1790–1885), English divine and antiquary
Henry Nicholson Ellacombe (1822–1916), English plantsman and author on botany and gardening